Kalinin Plant Production Association is a company based in Saint Petersburg, Russia. It is currently part of Techmash (Rostec group).

The Kalinin Plant Production Association produces munitions for the military. It is now involved in large-scale conversion from military to civil production.

The factory was founded in 1869 as the St. Petersburg Ammunition Factory; it was renamed after M. I. Kalinin in 1922.

References

External links
 Official website

Manufacturing companies of Russia
Companies based in Saint Petersburg
Tecmash
Defence companies of the Soviet Union
Companies nationalised by the Soviet Union
Ministry of the Defense Industry (Soviet Union)